Infrared thermography (IRT), thermal video and/or thermal imaging, is a process where a thermal camera captures and creates an image of an object by using infrared radiation emitted from the object in a process, which are examples of infrared imaging science. Thermographic cameras usually detect radiation in the long-infrared range of the electromagnetic spectrum (roughly 9,000–14,000 nanometers or 9–14 μm) and produce images of that radiation, called thermograms. Since infrared radiation is emitted by all objects with a temperature above absolute zero according to the black body radiation law, thermography makes it possible to see one's environment with or without visible illumination. The amount of radiation emitted by an object increases with temperature; therefore, thermography allows one to see variations in temperature. When viewed through a thermal imaging camera, warm objects stand out well against cooler backgrounds; humans and other warm-blooded animals become easily visible against the environment, day or night. As a result, thermography is particularly useful to the military and other users of surveillance cameras.

Some physiological changes in human beings and other warm-blooded animals can also be monitored with thermal imaging during clinical diagnostics. Thermography is used in allergy detection and veterinary medicine. Some alternative medicine practitioners promote its use for breast screening, despite the FDA warning that "those who opt for this method instead of mammography may miss the chance to detect cancer at its earliest stage". Government and airport personnel used thermography to detect suspected swine flu cases during the 2009 pandemic.

Thermography has a long history, although its use has increased dramatically with the commercial and industrial applications of the past fifty years.  Firefighters use thermography to see through smoke, to find persons, and to localize the base of a fire. Maintenance technicians use thermography to locate overheating joints and sections of power lines, which are a sign of impending failure. Building construction technicians can see thermal signatures that indicate heat leaks in faulty thermal insulation and can use the results to improve the efficiency of heating and air-conditioning units.

The appearance and operation of a modern thermographic camera is often similar to a camcorder. Often the live thermogram reveals temperature variations so clearly that a photograph is not necessary for analysis. A recording module is therefore not always built-in.

Specialized thermal imaging cameras use focal plane arrays (FPAs) that respond to longer wavelengths (mid- and long-wavelength infrared). The most common types are InSb, InGaAs, HgCdTe and QWIP FPA. The newest technologies use low-cost, uncooled microbolometers as FPA sensors. Their resolution is considerably lower than that of optical cameras, mostly 160x120 or 320x240 pixels, up to 1280 x 1024 for the most expensive models. Thermal imaging cameras are much more expensive than their visible-spectrum counterparts, and higher-end models are often export-restricted due to the military uses for this technology. Older bolometers or more sensitive models such as InSb require cryogenic cooling, usually by a miniature Stirling cycle refrigerator or liquid nitrogen.

Thermal energy

Thermal images, or thermograms, are actually visual displays of the amount of infrared energy emitted, transmitted, and reflected by an object. Because there are multiple sources of the infrared energy, it is difficult to get an accurate temperature of an object using this method.  A thermal imaging camera is capable of performing algorithms to interpret that data and build an image. Although the image shows the viewer an approximation of the temperature at which the object is operating, the camera is actually using multiple sources of data based on the areas surrounding the object to determine that value rather than detecting the actual temperature.

This phenomenon may become clearer upon consideration of the formula:

Incident Radiant Power = Emitted Radiant Power + Transmitted Radiant Power + Reflected Radiant Power;

where incident radiant power is the radiant power profile when viewed through a thermal imaging camera. 
Emitted radiant power is generally what is intended to be measured; 
transmitted radiant power is the radiant power that passes through the subject from a remote thermal source, and; 
reflected radiant power is the amount of radiant power that reflects off the surface of the object from a remote thermal source.

This phenomenon occurs everywhere, all the time. It is a process known as radiant heat exchange, since radiant power × time equals radiant energy. However, in the case of infrared thermography, the above equation is used to describe the radiant power within the spectral wavelength passband of the thermal imaging camera in use. The radiant heat exchange requirements described in the equation apply equally at every wavelength in the electromagnetic spectrum.

If the object is radiating at a higher temperature than its surroundings, then power transfer will be taking place and power will be radiating from warm to cold following the principle stated in the second law of thermodynamics. So if there is a cool area in the thermogram, that object will be absorbing the radiation emitted by the warm object.

The ability of objects to emit is called emissivity, to absorb radiation is called absorptivity. Under outdoor environments, convective cooling from wind may also need to be considered when trying to get an accurate temperature reading.

The thermal imaging camera would next employ a series of mathematical algorithms. Since the camera is only able to see the electromagnetic radiation that is impossible to detect with the human eye, it will build a picture in the viewer and record a visible picture, usually in a JPG format.

In order to perform the role of non-contact temperature recorder, the camera will change the temperature of the object being viewed with its emissivity setting.

Other algorithms can be used to affect the measurement, including the transmission ability of the transmitting medium (usually air) and the temperature of that transmitting medium. All these settings will affect the ultimate output for the temperature of the object being viewed.

This functionality makes the thermal imaging camera an excellent tool for the maintenance of electrical and mechanical systems in industry and commerce. By using the proper camera settings and by being careful when capturing the image, electrical systems can be scanned and problems can be found. Faults with steam traps in steam heating systems are easy to locate.

In the energy savings area, the thermal imaging camera can do more. Because it can see the effective radiation temperature of an object as well as what that object is radiating towards, it can help locate sources of thermal leaks and overheated regions as well.

Emissivity
Emissivity is a term that is often misunderstood and misused. It represents a material's ability to emit thermal radiation and is an optical property of matter.

Each material has a different emissivity, which may vary by temperature and infrared wavelength. For example, clean metal surfaces have emissivity that decreases at longer wavelengths; many dielectric materials, such as quartz (SiO2), sapphire (Al2O3), calcium fluoride (CaF2), etc. have emissivity that increases at longer wavelength; simple oxides, such as iron oxide (Fe2O3) display relatively flat emissivity in the infrared spectrum.

A material's emissivity can range from a theoretical 0.00 (completely not-emitting) to an equally theoretical 1.00 (completely emitting). An example of a substance with low emissivity would be silver, with an emissivity coefficient of .02. An example of a substance with high emissivity would be asphalt, with an emissivity coefficient of .98.

A black body is a theoretical object with an emissivity of 1 that radiates thermal radiation characteristic of its contact temperature.

An ordinary object emits less infrared radiation than a theoretical black body. The fraction of its actual emission to the theoretical emission (of the black body) is its emissivity (or emissivity coefficient).

In order to make a temperature measurement of an object using an infrared imager, it is necessary to estimate or determine the object's emissivity. For quick work, a thermographer may refer to an emissivity table for a given type of object, and enter that value into the imager. The imager would then calculate the object's contact temperature based on the value entered from the table and the object's emission of infrared radiation as detected by the imager.

In order to get a more accurate temperature measurement, a thermographer may apply a standard material of known, high emissivity to the surface of the object. The standard material might be as complex as industrial emissivity spray produced specifically for the purpose, or as simple as standard black insulation tape, with an emissivity of about 0.97. The object's known temperature can then be measured using the standard emissivity. If desired, the object's actual emissivity (on a part of the object that is not covered by the standard material) can then be determined by adjusting the imager's setting to the known temperature. There are situations, however, when such an emissivity test is not possible due to dangerous or inaccessible conditions. In these situations, the thermographer must rely on tables.

Difference from infrared film

Night vision infrared devices image in the near-infrared, just beyond the visual spectrum, and can see emitted or reflected near-infrared in complete visual darkness. However, again, these are not usually used for thermography due to the high temperature requirements, but are instead used with active near-IR sources.

Starlight-type night vision devices generally only magnify ambient light.

Passive vs. active thermography
All objects above the absolute zero temperature (0 K) emit infrared radiation. Hence, an excellent way to measure thermal variations is to use an infrared vision device, usually a focal plane array (FPA) infrared camera capable of detecting radiation in the mid (3 to 5 μm) and long (7 to 14 μm) wave infrared bands, denoted as MWIR and LWIR, corresponding to two of the high transmittance infrared windows. Abnormal temperature profiles at the surface of an object are an indication of a potential problem.

In passive thermography, the features of interest are naturally at a higher or lower temperature than the background.  Passive thermography has many applications such as surveillance of people on a scene and medical diagnosis (specifically thermology).

In active thermography, an energy source is required to produce a thermal contrast between the feature of interest and the background. The active approach is necessary in many cases given that the inspected parts are usually in equilibrium with the surroundings. Given the super-linearities of the black-body radiation, active thermography can also be used to enhance the resolution of imaging systems beyond their diffraction limit or to achieve super-resolution microscopy.

Advantages
It shows a visual picture so temperatures over a large area can be compared. It is capable of catching moving targets in real time. It is able to find deterioration, i.e., higher temperature components prior to their failure. It can be used to measure or observe in areas inaccessible or hazardous for other methods. It is a non-destructive test method. It can be used to find defects in shafts, pipes, and other metal or plastic parts. It can be used to detect objects in dark areas. It has some medical application, essentially in physiotherapy.

Limitations and disadvantages
There are various cameras cheaper and more expensive.
Quality cameras often have a high price range (often US$3,000 or more) due to the expense of the larger pixel array (state of the art 1280 x 1024), while less expensive models (with pixel arrays of 40x40 up to 160x120 pixels) are also available. Fewer pixels reduce the image quality making it more difficult to distinguish proximate targets within the same field of view.

There is also a difference in refresh rate. Some cameras may only have a refreshing value of 5 –15 Hz, other (e.g. FLIR X8500sc) 180 Hz or even more in no full window mode.

Also the lens can be integrated or not.

Many models do not provide the irradiance measurements used to construct the output image; the loss of this information without a correct calibration for emissivity, distance, and ambient temperature and relative humidity entails that the resultant images are inherently incorrect measurements of temperature.

Images can be difficult to interpret accurately when based upon certain objects, specifically objects with erratic temperatures, although this problem is reduced in active thermal imaging.

Thermographic cameras create thermal images based on the radiant heat energy it receives.  As radiation levels are influenced by the emissivity and reflection of radiation such as sunlight from the surface being measured this causes errors in the measurements.
 Most cameras have ±2% accuracy or worse in measurement of temperature and are not as accurate as contact methods.
 Methods and instruments are limited to directly detecting surface temperatures.

Applications

 Condition monitoring
 Low slope and flat roofing inspections
 Building diagnostics including building envelope inspections, moisture inspections, and energy losses in buildings
 Thermal mapping
 Digital infrared thermal imaging in health care
 Medical imaging
 Non-contact thermography, contact thermography and dynamic angiothermography
 Peripheral vascular disease screening.
 Carotid artery stenosis (CAS) screening through skin thermal maps.
 Active Dynamic Thermography (ADT) for medical applications.
 Neuromusculoskeletal disorders.
 Extracranial cerebral and facial vascular disease.
 Thyroid gland abnormalities.
 Various other neoplastic, metabolic, and inflammatory conditions.
 Archaeological kite aerial thermography
 Thermology
 Veterinary Thermal Imaging
 Thermal imaging in ornithology and other wildlife monitoring
 Night vision and Targeting
 UAV Surveillance
 Stereo vision
 Research
 Process control
 Nondestructive testing
 Surveillance in security, law enforcement and defence
 Chemical imaging
 Volcanology
 Building

Thermal imaging cameras convert the energy in the infrared wavelength into a visible light display. All objects above absolute zero emit thermal infrared energy, so thermal cameras can passively see all objects, regardless of ambient light.

The spectrum and amount of thermal radiation depend strongly on an object's surface temperature.  This makes it possible for a thermal imaging camera to display an object's temperature. However, other factors also influence the radiation, which limits the accuracy of this technique. For example, the radiation depends not only on the temperature of the object, but is also a function of the emissivity of the object. Also, radiation originates from the surroundings and is reflected in the object, and the radiation from the object and the reflected radiation will also be influenced by the absorption of the atmosphere.

Standards 
ASTM International (ASTM)
ASTM C1060,  Standard Practice for Thermographic Inspection of Insulation Installations in Envelope Cavities of Frame Buildings
ASTM C1153,  Standard Practice for the Location of Wet Insulation in Roofing Systems Using Infrared Imaging
ATSM D4788,  Standard Test Method for Detecting Delamination in Bridge Decks Using Infrared Thermography
ASTM E1186,  Standard Practices for Air Leakage Site Detection in Building Envelopes and Air Barrier Systems
ASTM E1934,  Standard Guide for Examining Electrical and Mechanical Equipment with Infrared Thermography
Standard for Infrared Inspection of Electrical Systems and Rotating Equipment
Standard for Infrared Inspection of Insulated Roofs
Standard for Infrared Inspection of Building Envelopes
Standard for Infrared Inspections to Detect Pests and Pest Related Damage
Standard for Infrared Inspection of Installed Photovoltaic (PV) Systems
Standard for Infrared Inspection of Recreational Yachts and Small Craft Constructed of Fiberglass Reinforced Plastic and Composite Materials
Standard for Infrared Thermal Imaging of Horses
Standard for Measuring and Compensating for Emittance Using Infrared Imaging Radiometers
Standard for Measuring and Compensating for Reflected Temperature Using Infrared Imaging Radiometers
Standard for Measuring and Compensating for Transmittance of an Attenuating Medium Using Infrared Imaging Radiometers
Standard for Measuring Distance/Target Size Values for Infrared Imaging Radiometers

International Organization for Standardization (ISO)
ISO 6781, Thermal insulation – Qualitative detection of thermal irregularities in building envelopes – Infrared method
ISO 18434-1, Condition monitoring and diagnostics of machines – Thermography – Part 1: General procedures
ISO 18436-7, Condition monitoring and diagnostics of machines – Requirements for qualification and assessment of personnel – Part 7: Thermography

Biological counterpart 
Thermography by definition is by means of an instrument (artifact), but some living creatures have natural organs that function as counterparts to bolometers, and thus possess a crude type of thermal imaging capability (thermoception). One of the best known examples is infrared sensing in snakes.

CCD and CMOS thermography 

Non-specialized CCD and CMOS sensors have most of their spectral sensitivity in the visible light wavelength range.

At temperatures of 600 °C and above, inexpensive cameras with CCD and CMOS sensors have also been used for pyrometry in the visible spectrum. They have been used for soot in flames, burning coal particles, heated materials, SiC filaments, and smoldering embers. This pyrometry has been performed using external filters or only the sensor's Bayer filters. It has been performed using color ratios, grayscales, and/or a hybrid of both.

See also

References

External links 

Infrared Tube, infrared imaging science demonstrations
Compix, Some uses of thermographic images in electronics
Thermographic Images, Infrared pictures
Uncooled thermal imaging works round the clock by Lawrence Mayes
Archaeological aerial thermography
IR Thermometry & Thermography Applications Repository , IR Thermometry & Thermography Applications Repository

Infrared imaging
Surveillance